Pardal is the surname of:

Chris Pardal (born 1972), Actor
Edmilson Marques Pardal (born 1980), Brazilian footballer
Fernando Rielo Pardal (1923–2004), Spanish mystical poet, philosopher, author, metaphysician and founder of a Catholic religious institute
Manuel Ribeiro Pardal (died 1671), Portuguese privateer in Spanish service
Walter Gómez Pardal (1927–2004), Uruguayan footballer

See also
Pardal Mallet (1864-1894), Brazilian journalist and novelist
El Pardal, a village in Spain

Surnames from nicknames